M56 or M-56 may refer to:

Roads
 M56 motorway, a motorway in England
 M56 Lena highway (Russia)
 M56 Kolyma Highway, Russia
 M56 (Cape Town), a Metropolitan Route in Cape Town, South Africa
 M56 (Johannesburg), a Metropolitan Route in Johannesburg, South Africa
 M-56 (1919–1957 Michigan highway), a former state highway in Michigan in the Monroe area
 M-56 (1971–1987 Michigan highway), another former state highway in Michigan in the Flint area

Guns
 M56 Howitzer, a Yugoslav copy of the M101A1 howitzer
 M56 Scorpion, an unarmoured American self-propelled anti-tank gun
 M56 Smart Gun, a fictional weapon used in Aliens (film) and related media
 Zastava M56 submachine gun, a Yugoslavian submachine gun

Other
 Messier 56, a globular cluster in the constellation Lyra
 M56 Coyote, Humvee smoke generator
 BMW M56, a straight-6 automobile engine 
 The core of the ATI Radeon Mobility X1600 graphics processing unit 
 M-56 steel helmet, designed in East Germany in 1956
 Infiniti M56, a Japanese luxury car
 A shortened designation for American M-1956 Load-Carrying Equipment